The South Derbyshire Miners' Association was a trade union representing coal miners in the Derbyshire area of England.

The union was founded in 1888, and was originally known as the South Derbyshire Amalgamated Miners' Association.
By the following year, it had 2,140 members, although this fell to only 1,408 in 1898.  Thereafter, it gradually rebuilt membership, which peaked at more than 6,000 in the 1920s.

In 1889, the union was a founder constituent of the Miners' Federation of Great Britain.  In 1945, this became the National Union of Mineworkers (NUM), and the union became its South Derbyshire Area, with less autonomy than before.

In 1985, the South Derbyshire Area split away from the NUM, to become a founder constituent of the new Union of Democratic Mineworkers.

General Secretaries
1888: William Buckley
1923: William Knight Smith
1928: Herbert Buck
c.1950: Harry Wileman
1965: Ken Toon

References

Mining trade unions
National Union of Mineworkers (Great Britain)
Politics of Derbyshire
1888 establishments in England
Mining in Derbyshire
Trade unions established in 1888
Trade unions disestablished in 1985
Trade unions based in Derbyshire